Room to Improve is an Irish architectural renovation TV series broadcast on RTÉ One. It is also broadcast on the UK's Home channel.

Format
Presented by the architect Dermot Bannon, his aim is to improve his clients' living conditions by renovating their homes without spending excessive sums of money. The budgets differ for each client, ranging from €27,000 to €250,000.

Bannon's architectural designs frequently include box-shaped extensions with large windows and interior 'courtyard' gardens. He favours open-plan interior layouts and spacious rooms and he generally seeks to maximise the penetration of natural light into the plans, but introduces several new steps into the layout. He has a keen interest in gardens and outdoor space and his designs usually provide access to these outdoor spaces and make the most of any views. He has a love of natural materials and often uses timber in kitchens. He has a dislike of fussy ornamentation and ostentatious "bling" and a strong preference for restraint and simplicity. His strong opinions on decor often brings him into conflict with his clients. Bannon is renowned for acting as house hold items such as "I'm the oven" and "I'm the toilet".

Room To Improve often features candid coverage of disagreements or problems on site and presents a "warts and all" picture of the realities of managing a building project.

Broadcasts
From 17 May 2021 Room to Improve was broadcast in a lunchtime slot during the week on the UK's Channel 5, after they had licensed series 8 to 12 from RTÉ. Series 1 began transmission on the same channel commencing Thursday 8 July 2021.

Episode list

Series 1
The first series had six episodes.

Series 2
The second series had eight episodes.

Series 3
The third series had eight episodes.

Christmas Special (2009)
A Room To Improve For Christmas

Series 4
The fourth series had eight episodes.

Series 5
The fifth series had six episodes.

Series 6
The sixth series had four episodes.

Christmas special (2012)
Tallaght's National Children's Hospital commissions Bannon to create an outdoor garden and recreation area for children and their families.

Series 7
The seventh series had six episodes.

Series 8
There were eight episodes in series 8.

Series 9
There were five episodes in series 9.

Series 10
Series 10 has six episodes.

Series 11

Series 12
There were eight episodes in series 12.

References

External links
 Official website

2007 Irish television series debuts
2010s Irish television series
COCO Television
Home renovation television series
Irish makeover television series
RTÉ original programming